Angami (also: Gnamei, Ngami, Tsoghami, Tsugumi, Monr, Tsanglo, Tenyidie) is a Naga language spoken in the Naga Hills in the northeastern part of India, in Kohima district, Nagaland. In 2011, there is an estimate of 153,000 first language (L1) Angami speakers. Under the UNESCO's Language Vitality and Endangerment framework, Angami is at the level of "vulnerable", meaning that it is still spoken by most children, but "may be restricted to certain domains".

Phonology

Consonants 
This table represents the consonantal structure of the Khonoma dialect.

The post-alveolar approximants are truly retroflex (sub-apical)  before mid and low vowels, but laminal  before high vowels.

Angami voiceless nasals are unusual in that, unlike the voiceless nasals of Burmese, they have a positive rather than negative voice onset time—that is, they are aspirated rather than partially voiced. The same is true of the laterals. In both cases, the aspiration has the formants characteristic of Angami h, which is somewhat velar in pronunciation. The other voiceless approximants may not be aspirated, as the h-like formants occur during the entire hold of the consonant.

Vowels 
The following are the vowels of the Khonoma dialect.

The labial and labialized consonants have labiodental affricate allophones before  (but not in  consonant clusters). In addition, about half the time, the rhotic becomes syllabic (a rhotic vowel) in this environment:

Grammar and lexicon 
A wealth of Angami grammars, lexicons are available in Tenyidie and in English. However, these collections often 
conflict in their analysis of the phonemic or syntactic nature of the language. This is due to the difference at the time 
of the documentation, and the choice of informants from varying  dialect. Especially in the earlier language 
documentations (1870s-1960s), mostly by Christian missionary; their informants' meta-data were not specified and 
any dialect of Angami were assumed to be the "standard" of Angami within the Nagaland region. The Angami-English Phrasebook  and Angami-English-Hindi dictionary  available online.

Text collection 
The bulk of available Anagami texts are from printed materials (novels, poems and textbooks), the largest text assortment of electronic texts are  mostly Christian  religious or devotional  materials written in Tenyidie. This is because the majority of Angami speakers in the Nagaland are Christians . The complete Tenyidie bible was published in 1970. However, only the translated chapter of Genesis  from the bible was posted on the internet under The Rosetta Project. Also, Christian devotional materials such as The Bible...Basically® in Tenyidie  are also available online.

Another source of text is largely from the ethnic folktales (e.g.  Angami Naga folklore by Sekhose, 1970) and 
especially from song lyrics written in Tenyidie. Other than Christian songs written by the Angami church community 
(e.g.  Shieshülie songbook by Baptist Revival Church), the rising rock music culture started to stir in the Nagaland as the music events and societies like the  Hornbill National Rock Contest  and  Rattle and Hum Music Society  and Angami pop/rock bands such as the Cultural Vibrants take the Angami music by storm; they popularized traditional Angami folk music that used to be passed down orally, it is foreseeable that these lyrics will be written in the near future.

The next largest source of Tenyidie is the educational materials used in the Kohima schools and university.  
Although much of these texts are in printed forms, a query on the web does retrieve some Indian exams papers  that contain test questions on Tenyidie. Also the Tenyidie syllabus for the university courses in Kohima College would have been the primary source of language data for Angami.

See also 
 Angami Naga
 Tibetic languages

References

Bibliography

Notes

External links
 Khonama materials at UCLA
 Angami Language Intro

Angami–Pochuri languages
Languages of Nagaland
Endangered languages of India